The J Awards are an annual series of Australian music awards that were established by the Australian Broadcasting Corporation's youth-focused radio station Triple J and which are judged by the music and on-air teams from radio stations Triple J, Triple J Unearthed and Double J The awards are given in an on-air ceremony held in November each year as part of triple j's AusMusic Month.

Background and awards
As part of Triple J's 30th anniversary celebrations in 2005, the station inaugurated a single "J Award" to be given for "an album of outstanding achievement as an Australian musical work of art – for its creativity, innovation, musicianship and contribution to Australian music."

Australian Album of the Year
The Judging criteria for the award is open to any album released (November the previous year to October the current year) either independently or through a record company by an Australian artist. The album must be available for purchase (All genres are considered) and any album sent to triple j in consideration for airplay is automatically also in consideration for the J Award given it’s received by triple j within this period. This award was renamed as the Australian Album of the Year in 2007.

Unearthed Artist of the Year
In 2007, a new award for Unearthed Artist of the Year was introduced. The triple j judges now looking back over the winners of site competitions over the year and awarding the triple j Unearthed J Award to the best and most promising artist. The Judging criteria for the Unearthed Artist of the Year is open to any artist who has had a ground breaking and impactful last 12 months. Any Unearthed artist who wins a sponsored competition or is featured on Unearthed is eligible for this award. Any artist registered on the Unearthed site during this period is also eligible in consideration for nomination for this award.

Australian Music Video of the Year
In 2008, a new award for Australian Music Video of the Year was added. originally with triple j tv as a co-presenter but that role is now filled by ABC TV program rage. The music video of the year being determined for its outstanding achievement as an Australian musical video work of art (based on its creativity, originality and technical excellence). The music video is selected from any music video released by an Australian artist (either independently or through a record company) and that is also directed by and Australian director between November and December the preceding year.

Double J Australian Artist of the Year
In 2014, A new award for Double J Australian Artist of the Year, which was introduced. It was awarded by Double J, triple j's sister station, to the artist that the station had seen as the greatest contributor to either recorded music, live performances or Australian music culture, or a combination of the three, during the course of the year.

This award celebrates artists who have released or produced an album that has resonated with Double J as an impressive musical work of art; have pulled off significant live performances, events or tours; or made a valued contribution through their music to Australian arts and culture.

You Done Good Award
In 2019, a fifth award for You Done Good Award  was added to the schedule. The award goes to an Australian who has "made an impact on the industry through outstanding achievement, social change or altruistic endeavours."

The J Award trophy
The initial style of J Award trophy was a rectangular glass plaque with the J Award logo over a section of frosted glass. It was only used from 2005 until 2007 and can be seen in photos with past winners under the history section of the J Award website.

The current J Award trophy is a 3-D design that features the top third of the J Award logo, the Emu and Kangaroo crossed necks and heads, and is made of glass and has the Categories & Winners inscribed onto them. It has remained largely unchanged since its inception in 2008.

Awards by year
To see the full article for a particular year, please click on the year link.

Most awards
The only artists to have won more than one J Award are: Tame Impala, who won Australian Album of the Year in 2010 and 2012; King Gizzard and the Lizard Wizard, who won Double J Artist of the Year and Australian Music Video of the Year in 2016 and Sampa the Great, who won Double J Artist of the Year and Australian Music Video of the Year in 2019.

References

External links
 

Australian music awards
Triple J
Awards established in 2005
2005 establishments in Australia